Michałówek may refer to the following places:
Michałówek, Łowicz County in Łódź Voivodeship (central Poland)
Michałówek, Zgierz County in Łódź Voivodeship (central Poland)
Michałówek, Otwock County in Masovian Voivodeship (east-central Poland)
Michałówek, Płońsk County in Masovian Voivodeship (east-central Poland)
Michałówek, Warsaw West County in Masovian Voivodeship (east-central Poland)
Michałówek, Opole Voivodeship (south-west Poland)